The Buguns (formerly Khowa) are one of the earliest recognized schedule tribe of India, majority of them, inhabiting the Singchung Sub-Division of West Kameng District of Arunachal Pradesh. Their total population is approximately 3000. The notable features of Buguns are reflected in their simple life and warm hospitality. Buguns live in several exogamous clans. Traditionally, the predominant occupation was agriculture, supported with other allied activities like fishing and hunting, cattle rearing etc. Buguns have their own folklores, songs, dances, music and rituals. A rare bird, the Bugun liocichla, was named after the tribe.

They live mainly in the subtropical Singchung Administrative Sub-Division of West Kameng district with its, almost whole, native population under 6-Thrizino-Buragaon ST Assembly Constituency of the state of Arunachal Pradesh. According to the native legend, they believed that they are the descendants of a single forefather Achinphumphulua.

Language
The Bugun language, one two of the Bugunish/Kamenic language under Kho-Bwa languages is listed as an endangered languages of India.

Livelihood
Acting as a basis of their livelihood, shifting cultivation is practiced and domestic animals such as cow, horse, pig, sheep, goat, fowl and the mithun are reared. To enrich their diet, wild animals are hunted using simple spears, traps, bows and arrows.

Culture
Like Miji and Aka, long hair is kept by some members of both sexes. While both sexes adorn themselves with silver ornaments, the men wear a very long white garment and a very high hat, resembling a Turkish Fez. The women wear a skull cap, sometimes decorated with beautiful patterns. White and checkered jackets are worn as well, usually accompanied by another singlet.

Religion
The Buguns are traditionally followers of the animistic religion However, the early 20th century witnessed the gradual penetration of some dominant religions like Buddhism (Mahayana), particularly from the neighbouring ethnic group Sherdukpen, and Hinduism. Some have come under Tibetan Buddhist influence. Profound Buddhist influence has led to the adoption of many Buddhist rituals and the invitation of Buddhist lamas to participate in their communal rituals. As a result, many Buguns declared themselves as Buddhist in censuses. Recently, some Buguns have converted to Christianity. Nevertheless, a large portion of Bugun (Khowa) population are still following their tradition way of animistic rituals and priesthood.

Festivals
Pham-Kho (a harvesting festival) is a popular festival of the Bugun people which is now celebrated on 10 September every year. Pham Kho Sowai literally means "mountain" (pham) and "river" or "water" (kho), which are considered vital component required for human survival. The benevolent gods manifest in the form of the mountain and river, giving life to the people. Therefore, the Pham-Kho festival is a harvesting festival celebrated by Bugun (Khowa) community of Arunachal Pradesh. Other Important festival of Buguns are Kshyat-Sowai and Diying-Kho.

Especially in Sraiba (a holy place with a ground for worship and related rituals) of every major villages, Kshyat-Sowai/Diying-Kho and Pham Kho is celebrated by the Bugun, in which the Phabi priest plays an important role in conducting the ceremony and religious rituals.

Songs and dances such as Clown and Gasyo-Syo have a close affiliation with their religion. Feasts during these festivals mainly includes their traditional foods and Phua (local brew).

Government
Traditionally, Buguns have their own socio-politico-administrative decision-making system to regulate their society. The traditional village council of the Bugun (Khowa) is known as Nimiyang (Council of Elders), which looks after every aspect of village life, may it be decision-making, utilization of local resources, conflict resolution or regulating the society. Each family is represented in the Nimiang sessions by its head male member. The traditional village council of buguns are headed by Thap-Bkhow (Village-Chief). The Thap-Bkhow is an accepted leader and selected unanimously and not hereditary. There is no strict criterion for selection of the Thap-Bakhow, but a person with economic affluence, social stature, knowledge of customary laws, sound mentality, physical strength and generosity are taken into consideration. He presides over the meetings and sittings of the Nimiyang session. It is customary that only male member possessing above qualities can become Thap-Bakhow. Women may witnesses proceedings of the Nimiyang sessions, but can only contribute if its male member is absent.

Migration
Migration of Buguns to its present location are unknown. However, their mythology reveals that they have probably migrated from Tibet via East Kameng.(Buguns are subdivided into sections according to their specific locality known by different names:-Hakhongdua, Braidua, Khuchundua, Hajidua Dachandua and 
Hayindua).

Bugun villages
Some of the Bugun villages are:-
 Wanghoo,
 Dikhiyang, 
 Singchung,
 Lichini,
 Ramu,
 Namfri/Mangopam
 Chitu,
 Sachida,
 Diching,
 Kaspi,
 Bichom (a Model Village which partially included people from Lichini, Ramu, Chitu, Sachida,).
 Tenga Market under Singchung and Nag Mandir of Kaspi are main market places for them.
 Dahung.

Buguns relation with neighbouring tribes
Buguns maintained good relations with their neighbouring tribes since they are surrounded by tribes like Sherdukpen, Aka (Hrusso), Monpa (Especially, Bhut Monpa/Sartang)and Mijis. 
 Buguns of Wanghoo and Dikhiyang had very close affinity with Monpa (Especially, Bhut Monpa/Sartang). Even Inter-Marriage among most of the clans of both the tribes are tabooed. Irrespective of their tribes they considered them as their own brothers. 
 Buguns of Singchung village have maintained very good relations with Sherdukpens since from the time immemorial. Like Buguns of Wanghoo/Dikhiyang intermarriages among some of the clans irrespective of their tribes are restricted as they consider them as their brothers and sisters. Even in religious aspects most of the Buguns of Singchung areas are influenced by Sherdukpen's Mahayana cult of Buddhism. 
 Further Buguns of Lichini, Ramu, Chitu and Kaspi area have very close brotherly relations with Akas (Hrusso)during early days. 
 And Buguns bordering Miji (Sajalong) territories have also maintained good rapport with them like Buguns of Ditching and Bichom valley.

Active organisations working for the community
  ABS- All Bugun (Khowa) Society. An apex (Socio-Cultural) decision making body of Bugun Society. Formerly known as ABYA-All Bugun Youth Association.
 ABSU- All Bugun (Khowa) Students Union. A community based student's organization.

Besides these, we will find many other NGOs working actively in some specific areas within Bugun territory like:- BWS- Bugun Welfare Society, Mt. Siphang Society etc.

Art Forms & Music

Gasyo-Syo

Gasyo-Syo which literally simply mean "To Dance" or "Lets Dance", is a popular dance form of Bugun (Khowa) Tribe of Arunachal Pradesh. There are many forms of Gasyo-Syo like Gek, Gidingdak etc. It is performed usually at every festive occasion like birth, marriage ceremonies and festivals like Pham Kho Sowai.

Bugun Music and dances are accompanied by traditional musical instruments like Thabam (Drum), Khenkhyap (Clappers), Beeyen (a single stringed fiddle), Gong (Mouth Organ made by bamboo & a string) and various types of Fly (Flute).

Some popular Music Albums are:

1. Oye (Audio).

2. Guiteh Bugundua (Audio).

3. Charit Lue Khung (Audio).

References

Bibliography
ArunachalFront.info (archived)
EchoofArunachal.com (archived)

External links 
 Endangered Languages
 Tribal Village Councils of Arunachal Pradesh
 Bugun Tribe
 LINGUISTIC AND ANTHROPOLOGICAL RESOURCES FOR THE BUGUN
 Bugun Language Guide
 Trip Report : Eastern Himalayas (including Eagle's Nest Wildlife Sanctuary)
 Ethnologue profile
 
 

Scheduled Tribes of India
Tribes of Arunachal Pradesh
West Kameng district
Buddhist communities of India
Donyi-Polo communities